Rasmus Katholm (born 22 June 1981) is a Danish professional football forward who currently is a free agent. He has played in the Danish Superliga with Randers FC.

External links
Rasmus Katholm profile
Danish Superliga statistics

1981 births
Living people
Aarhus Gymnastikforening players
AC Horsens players
Randers FC players
Danish men's footballers
Danish Superliga players
Danish 1st Division players
Brabrand IF players
FC Fredericia players
Hobro IK players

Association football forwards